Francisco das Chagas Marinho (8 February 1952 – 31 May 2014), generally known as Marinho Chagas or Francisco Marinho, was a Brazilian professional footballer. One of the best left-backs of his era, he is best known for his flowing curly blond hair and his performance at the 1974 FIFA World Cup, in which Brazil finished fourth. At club level he is mostly associated with Botafogo FR of Rio de Janeiro and São Paulo FC, but he played for numerous other teams, as well as in the North American Soccer League, in a career which spanned from 1969 to 1987.

Club career
Marinho Chagas was born in Natal, Rio Grande do Norte.  He played left-back with Botafogo FR of Rio and the Brazil national team. He played the Football World Cup 1974. He was a skilful and innovative right footed left back who was considered at the time one of the top players at his position. He was an attack minded full-back with a powerful shot, and is considered a pioneer, becoming very influential in helping the lateral position evolve into what it is in today's Brazilian football.

He travelled the world and played for many different clubs in Brazil, the US and Germany, always showing great skill and quality, but not settling anywhere for too long. His longest stint was with Botafogo, where he stayed four years from 1972 to 1976.

He spent two years in the  North American Soccer League. In the first year, playing for the New York Cosmos  alongside Carlos Alberto Torres and the German legend Franz Beckenbauer, his club lost in the semifinal of the championship to eventual winners Vancouver Whitecaps. Marinho scored 8 goals in his 24 matches that season.

The following year, playing with German striker phenomenon Gerd Müller for the Fort Lauderdale Strikers in Florida, he scored three goals in 19 matches. The Strikers finished the season as runners-up in the championship, losing the final 0-3 to the Cosmos. However, Marinho did not play in the final.

Back in Brazil he won with São Paulo FC the State Championship of São Paulo of 1981, the most notable title of his career, overcoming AA Ponte Preta in the finals 1-1, 2-0. His personal performance in this year yield him a third Bola de Prata of the specialist magazine Placar.

He ended his career as player with a brief stint in Germany where he played in the lowest amateur division, the local "C-Klasse", alongside some outdated former minor Bundesliga celebrities in Augsburg for the short-lived BC Harlekin, named after the chain of gambling halls operated by the quasi owner of the club, Mr Peter Eiba who had grand ideas to taking the club all the way to the first division.

After his return to Natal, Marinho stood as Liberal Party candidate for the city council, but was defeated.

His release of the single with the song Eu Sou Assim ("That's the way I am") did not enter him into a career in this sector.

In 1991, he was hired to coach the El Paso Patriots, an amateur team competing in the Southwest Independent Soccer League.

International career
With the Brazil national team Chagas played 36 matches (8 non-official) and scored four goals between 1973 and 1977.  He made his debut in a friendly match defeat to Sweden in June 1973. He started in every match during the 1974 FIFA World Cup, and was part of a very solid defense which only conceded four goals in seven matches on their way to a 4th-place finish. Chagas played his last game for Brazil in June 1977 against Yugoslavia.

Personal life and death
Marinho Chagas has no familial relation to the Brazilian serial killer, Francisco das Chagas Rodrigues de Brito, often referred to in press as simply, Francisco das Chagas.

Marinho Chagas died on 31 May 2014 in João Pessoa (RN), from a digestive hemorrhage. At the time of his death, he was working as a sports commentator for a station in Natal.  He was 62 years of age. The former full back had been battling alcoholism in his later years, seeking treatment for illnesses related to his drinking.

Marinho Chagas was a father of three, two sons and a daughter as well as a grandfather to three.  In an interview in 2013, he joked that he might have other children, given his wild ways, but that none of them come forward to claim him as their father.

Career statistics

Honours
São Paulo
 Campeonato Paulista (São Paulo State championship): 1981

ABC
 Campeonato Potiguar (Rio Grande do Norte State championship): 1971

Brazil
 Copa Roca: 1976
 Copa Rio Branco: 1976

Individual
 Bola de Prata: 1972, 1973, 1981 by Placar for best player of the year in his position.
 Silver award: South American Player of the Year in 1974 for second best player of South America
 Silver award: Bravo Otto in the 1974 Athlete category
 All-Star Team of 1974 FIFA World Cup

References

External links
 CBF
 Botafogopiaxao – photos & stats
 Rogério Micheletti: Marinho Chagas: Ex-lateral do Botafogo, Fluminense e São Paulo, Terceiro Tempo: Que fim levou?
 Dave Morrison: Francisco Marinho NASL Soccer: North American Soccer League Players.

1952 births
2014 deaths
People from Natal, Rio Grande do Norte
Bangu Atlético Clube players
Brazilian footballers
Brazilian expatriate footballers
Brazil international footballers
Campeonato Brasileiro Série A players
Botafogo de Futebol e Regatas players
Clube Náutico Capibaribe players
Fluminense FC players
Association football fullbacks
Fortaleza Esporte Clube players
Los Angeles Heat players
New York Cosmos players
North American Soccer League (1968–1984) players
Fort Lauderdale Strikers (1977–1983) players
São Paulo FC players
USISL coaches
Western Soccer Alliance players
1974 FIFA World Cup players
Expatriate soccer players in the United States
Brazilian football managers
Sportspeople from Rio Grande do Norte